Annika Hirvonen (born 2 June 1989) is a Swedish politician. She represents the constituency of Stockholm County in the Riksdag. She served as Member of the Riksdag from 24 June 2014 to 24 September 2018. She serves as Member of the Riksdag since 19 June 2019 after Alice Bah Kuhnke left to become Member of the European Parliament. She is affiliated with the Green Party.

Hirvonen was again elected as Member of the Riksdag in September 2022.

References

External links 
 

Living people
1989 births
Place of birth missing (living people)
21st-century Swedish politicians
21st-century Swedish women politicians
Members of the Riksdag 2014–2018
Members of the Riksdag 2018–2022
Members of the Riksdag 2022–2026
Members of the Riksdag from the Green Party
Women members of the Riksdag